Mon Plaisir at 19-21 Monmouth Street, Covent Garden, is London's oldest French restaurant, founded by Jean Viala and his wife in 1943.

It was opened by Jean Viala and his wife in 1943, and bought by their head waiter Monsieur Alain Lhermitte in 1972 who has expanded it from one to four dining rooms, retaining the zinc bar that came from a brothel in Lyons.

The team behind BBC Radio 4's The Moral Maze would have dinner on Wednesday evenings at Mon Plaisir, while Hugo Gryn (1930-1996), the rabbi and broadcaster, was alive.

References

External links

1943 establishments in England
Buildings and structures in the City of Westminster
Covent Garden
Restaurants established in 1943
European restaurants in London
French restaurants in the United Kingdom